Cliffdale is an unincorporated community in Calhoun County, Illinois, United States. Cliffdale is located along Illinois Route 100 south of Pearl.

History
Cliffdale was incorporated during the late 1800s when a post office was set up in it. The post office closed in 1914 and Cliffdale was unincorporated.

References

Unincorporated communities in Calhoun County, Illinois
Unincorporated communities in Illinois